Ulrika Christina Elisabeth Nord, stage name Ika Nord (born April 29, 1960 in Halmstad) is a Swedish actress and mime.

In Sweden, she is best known for her work in children's television shows, such as Ika i rutan and Ikas TV-kalas. Internationally, Nord is best known for her role (Virginia) in Let the Right One In (2008).

Ika Nord works as an actress, mime, clown and director.

Ika Nord studied classic ballet in Halmstad from the age of six to seventeen. Some years later, she studied in Paris at Conservatoire National de l’Art du Mime, then at Matt Mattox Jazz Art Dance School, École de Mime Étienne Decroux and L’Atelier de Théâtre Robert Cordier.

References

External links 
 Interview with Ika Nord in Göteborgs-Posten

1960 births
Living people
Swedish film actresses
Actors from Halmstad
Swedish mimes
Swedish television actresses
21st-century Swedish actresses